Irène Molitor (1 April 1927 – 2018) was a Swiss alpine skier who competed in the 1948 Winter Olympics.

References

1927 births
2018 deaths
Swiss female alpine skiers
Olympic alpine skiers of Switzerland
Alpine skiers at the 1948 Winter Olympics